Lethata is a genus of moths in the subfamily Stenomatinae.

Species
Lethata aletha Duckworth, 1967
Lethata amazona Duckworth, 1967
Lethata angusta Duckworth, 1967
Lethata anophthalma (Meyrick, 1931)
Lethata aromatica (Meyrick, 1915)
Lethata asthenopa (Meyrick, 1916)
Lethata bovinella (Busck, 1914)
Lethata buscki Duckworth, 1964
Lethata dispersa Duckworth, 1967
Lethata fernandezyepezi Duckworth, 1967
Lethata fusca Duckworth, 1964
Lethata glaucopa (Meyrick, 1912)
Lethata gypsolitha (Meyrick, 1931)
Lethata herbacea (Meyrick, 1931)
Lethata illustra Duckworth, 1967
Lethata irresoluta Duckworth, 1967
Lethata lanosa Duckworth, 1967
Lethata leucothea (Busck, 1914)
Lethata monopa Duckworth, 1967
Lethata mucida Duckworth, 1967
Lethata myopina (Zeller, 1877)
Lethata myrochroa (Meyrick, 1915)
Lethata obscura Duckworth, 1967
Lethata oculosa Duckworth, 1967
Lethata optima Duckworth, 1967
Lethata psidii (Sepp, [1852])
Lethata pyrenodes (Meyrick, 1915)
Lethata ruba Duckworth, 1964
Lethata satyropa (Meyrick, 1915)
Lethata sciophthalma (Meyrick, 1931)
Lethata striolata (Meyrick, 1932)
Lethata trochalosticta (Walsingham, 1913)

References

 
Stenomatinae